Nichifor Tarara (born 12 March 1936) is a Romanian sprint canoer who competed in the late 1950s. He won a bronze medal in the C-1 10000 m event at the 1958 ICF Canoe Sprint World Championships in Prague. He also competed in the men's coxless four rowing event at the 1964 Summer Olympics.

References

External links

1936 births
Living people
Romanian male canoeists
ICF Canoe Sprint World Championships medalists in Canadian
Romanian male rowers
Olympic rowers of Romania
Rowers at the 1964 Summer Olympics